Datuk Haji Ahmad Lai bin Bujang (26 November 1949 – 9 August 2019) was a Malaysian politician. He was the Member of the Parliament of Malaysia for the Sibuti constituency in Sarawak, representing the Parti Pesaka Bumiputera Bersatu (PBB) in the governing Barisan Nasional coalition.

Ahmad was elected to Parliament in the 2008 election, defeating Michael Teo Yu Keng of the People's Justice Party. Prior to being elected as a member of parliament, he was one of the political secretaries to the then-Chief Minister of Sarawak, Abdul Taib Mahmud. He was re-elected in 2013 and declined for health reasons to contest the 2018 election. He died on 9 August 2019, aged 69.

Election results

Honours

Honours of Malaysia
  :
  Commander of the Order of Meritorious Service (PJN) – Datuk (2017)

Honours of Sarawak
  :
  Commander of the Most Exalted Order of the Star of Sarawak (PSBS) – Dato (2017)

References

2019 deaths
Malaysian people of Malay descent
1949 births
Malaysian Muslims
Members of the Dewan Rakyat
People from Sarawak
Parti Pesaka Bumiputera Bersatu politicians